Prays fulvocanella is a moth in the family Plutellidae. It seems endemic to the Hawaiian island of Kauai.

External links
 Prays fulvocanella at www.catalogueoflife.org.

Plutellidae
Moths described in 1907